Edition may refer to:

 Edition (book), a bibliographical term for a substantially similar set of copies
 Edition (printmaking), a publishing term for a set print run
 Edition (textual criticism), a particular version of a text
 Edition Records, a British independent record label
 "Edition", a song by Rex Orange County

See also
 Edition (publisher), a list of publishers